The Basic Statute of the State (also referred to as Basic Law) is the cornerstone of the Omani legal system and it operates as a constitution for the country. The Basic Statute was issued in the year 1996 and thus far has been amended twice: once in 2011 as a response to protests occurring during the Arab Spring, and once in 2021 to introduce procedures for the appointment of a crown prince and new rules for parliament.

The Basic Statute stipulates that the system of governance is Sultani hereditary in the male descendants of Sayyid Turki bin Said bin Sultan, that the Sultan is the Head of the State and the Supreme Commander of Armed Forces, that he is to preside over the Council of Ministers, and that he is responsible for promulgating laws and appointing judges. 

The Basic Statute also stipulates that the Council of Ministers is the body responsible for implementing the general policies of the state, that Council of Oman, which is made up of the State Council, an appointed body, and the Shura Council, an elected body, is responsible for reviewing legislation and submitting it to the Sultan for royal assent, and that the judiciary is guaranteed independence.

Rights
Basic Law guarantees that, although Islam is Oman's state religion, the “freedom to practice religious rites in accordance with recognized customs...provided that it does not disrupt public order or conflict with accepted standards of behavior.”

The Basic Law forbids discrimination founded on “sex, ethnicity, color, language, religion, sect, domicile or social status.”

References

External links
 Basic Statute of the State

Law of Oman
Constitutional law
1996 in law